"This Is Not Ok!" was a single released by Northern Irish rock band Skruff in 2009.  The track was the lead single from the EP of their self-titled Skruff EP.
The Video for this song was filmed in Derry City Centre.

References

2009 singles
Skruff songs
2009 songs